Chrysoine resorcinol is a synthetic azo dye which was formerly used as a food additive.  In Europe, it was banned as a food additive in 1977. In the US, it was banned in 1988.

Chrysoine resorcinol can be used as a pH indicator with a color change between pH 11 and pH 12.7.
In colorimetry, it has an absorption maximum of 387 nm.

It can be synthesised via the azo coupling of sulfanilic acid and resorcinol.

Notes

External links
 Data at inchem.org
 MSDS at Fischer Scientific

Food colorings
Azo dyes
Benzenesulfonates
Organic sodium salts
Resorcinols
Anilines
Acid dyes